Harmodius (Greek: Ἁρμόδιος, Harmódios) and Aristogeiton (Ἀριστογείτων, Aristogeíton; both died 514 BC) were two lovers in Classical Athens who became known as the Tyrannicides (τυραννόκτονοι, tyrannoktonoi) for their assassination of Hipparchus, the brother of the tyrant Hippias, for which they were executed. A few years later, in 510 BC, the Spartan king Cleomenes I forced Hippias to go into exile, therefore opening the way to the subsequent democratic reforms of Cleisthenes. The Athenian democrats later celebrated Harmodius and Aristogeiton as national heroes, partially to conceal the role played by Sparta in the removal of the Athenian tyranny. Cleisthenes notably commissioned the famous statues of the Tyrannicides.

Background
The two principal historical sources covering Harmodius and Aristogeiton are the History of the Peloponnesian War (VI, 56–59) by Thucydides, and The Constitution of the Athenians (XVIII) attributed to Aristotle or his school. However, their story is documented by a great many other ancient writers, including important sources such as Herodotus and Plutarch.  Herodotus claimed that Harmodius and Aristogeiton presumably were "Gephyraeans" (el) i.e. Boeotians of Syrian or Phoenician origin. Plutarch, in his book On the malice of Herodotus, criticized Herodotus for prejudice and misrepresentation and he argued that Harmodius and Aristogeiton were Euboeans or Eretrians.

Peisistratus had become tyrant of Athens after his third attempt in 546/7 BC. In Archaic Greece, the term tyrant did not connote malevolence.  A tyrant was one who had seized power and ruled outside of a state's constitutional law. When Peisistratus died in 528/7 BC, his son Hippias took the position of Archon and became the new tyrant of Athens, with the help of his brother, Hipparchus, who acted as the minister of culture. The two continued their father's policies, but their popularity declined after Hipparchus began to abuse the power of his position.

Thucydides offers this explanation for Harmodios and Aristogeiton's actions in Book VI: Hipparchus approached Harmodius with amorous intentions. Harmodius was the eromenos (younger lover) of Aristogeiton. Harmodius rejected Hipparchus and told Aristogeiton what had happened. Hipparchus, spurned, invited Harmodius' young sister to be the kanephoros (to carry the ceremonial offering basket) at the Panathenaea festival, then publicly chased her away on the pretext she was not a virgin, as required, causing shame on Harmodius' family. With his lover Aristogeiton, Harmodius resolved to assassinate both Hippias and Hipparchus and thus to overthrow the tyranny. Harmodios and Aristogeiton successfully killed Hipparchus during the 514 BC Panathenaia, but Hippias survived and remained in power. In the four years between Hipparchus' assassination and the deposition of the Peisistratids, Hippias became an increasingly oppressive tyrant.

According to Aristotle, it was Thessalos, the hot-headed son of Peisistratus' Argive concubine, and thus half-brother to Hipparchus, who was the one to court Harmodius and drive off his sister.

The assassination

The plot – to be carried out by means of daggers hidden in the ceremonial myrtle wreaths on the occasion of the Panathenaic Games – involved a number of other co-conspirators. Thucydides claims that this day was chosen because during the Panathenaic festival, it was customary for the citizens taking part in the procession to go armed, while carrying weapons on any other day would have been suspicious. Aristotle disagrees, asserting that the custom of bearing weapons was introduced later, by the democracy.

Seeing one of the co-conspirators greet Hippias in a friendly manner on the assigned day, the two thought themselves betrayed and rushed into action, ruining the carefully laid plans. They managed to kill Hipparchus, stabbing him to death as he was organizing the Panathenaean processions at the foot of the Acropolis. Herodotus expresses surprise at this event, asserting that Hipparchus had received a clear warning concerning his fate in a dream. Harmodius was killed on the spot by spearmen of Hipparchus' guards, while Aristogeiton was arrested shortly thereafter. Upon being told of the event, Hippias, feigning calm, ordered the marching Greeks to lay down their ceremonial weapons and to gather at an indicated spot. All those with concealed weapons or under suspicion were arrested, gaining Hippias a respite from the uprising.

Thucydides' identification of Hippias as the two's purported main target, rather than Hipparchus who was Aristogeiton's rival erastes, has been suggested as a possible indication of bias on his part.

Aristogeiton's torture
Aristotle in the Constitution of Athens preserves a tradition that Aristogeiton died only after being tortured in the hope that he would reveal the names of the other conspirators. During his ordeal, personally overseen by Hippias, he feigned willingness to betray his co-conspirators, claiming only Hippias' handshake as guarantee of safety. Upon receiving the tyrant's hand he is reputed to have berated him for shaking the hand of his own brother's murderer, upon which the tyrant wheeled and struck him down on the spot.

Leæna

Likewise, there is a later tradition that Aristogeiton (or Harmodius) was in love with a courtesan (see hetaera) by the name of Leæna (Λέαινα – meaning lioness) who also was kept by Hippias under torture – in a vain attempt to force her to divulge the names of the other conspirators – until she died. One version of her story holds that previous to being tortured she had bitten off her tongue, afraid that her resolve would break from the pain of the torture. Another is that the Athenians, unwilling to honour a courtesan, placed a statue of a lioness without a tongue in the vestibule of the Acropolis simply to honor her fortitude in maintaining silence.  The statue was made by the sculptor Amphicrates. Pausanias alleges that it was in her honor that Athenian statues of Aphrodite began from then on to be accompanied by stone lionesses. Leæna's story, however, is only told in later antiquity sources and is likely spurious.

Aftermath
His brother's murder led Hippias to establish an even stricter tyranny, which proved very unpopular and was overthrown, after an intervention of an army from Sparta led by the king Cleomenes I, in 510. This was followed by the reforms of Cleisthenes, who established a democracy in Athens.

Apotheosis
Subsequent history came to identify the figures of Harmodius and Aristogeiton as martyrs to the cause of Athenian freedom, possibly for political and class reasons, and they became known as "the Liberators" (eleutherioi) and "the Tyrannicides" (tyrannophonoi). According to later writers, descendants of Harmodius and Aristogeiton's families were given hereditary privileges, such as sitesis (the right to take meals at public expense in the town hall), ateleia (exemption from certain religious duties), and proedria (front-row seats in the theater). A number of years after the event, it had become a received tradition among the Athenians to believe that Hipparchus was the elder of the brothers, and to fashion him as the tyrant. The story of the tyrannicides was heavily promoted by the Athenians in order to erase the embarrassment of owing the removal of their tyranny to Sparta.

Statues and artistic depictions
After the establishment of democracy, Cleisthenes commissioned the sculptor Antenor to produce a bronze statue group of Harmodius and Aristogeiton. It was the first commission of its kind, and the very first statue to be paid for out of public funds, as the two were the first Greeks considered by their countrymen worthy of having statues raised to them. According to Pliny the Elder, it was erected in the Kerameikos in 509, as part of a cenotaph of the heroes. However, a far more probable location is in the Agora at Athens, and many later authors such as Pausanius and Timaeus attest to this. Annual offerings (enagismata) were presented there by the polemarch, the Athenian minister of war. There it stood alone as special laws prohibited the erection of any other statues in their vicinity. Upon its base was inscribed a verse by the poet Simonides:

The statue was taken as war booty in 480 BC by Xerxes I during the early Greco-Persian Wars and installed by him at Susa. As soon as the Greeks vanquished the Persians at Salamis, a new statue was commissioned. It was sculpted this time by Kritios and Nesiotes, and set up in 477/476 BC. It is the one which served as template for the group we possess today, which was found in the ruins of Hadrian's villa and is now in Naples. According to Arrian, when Alexander the Great conquered the Persian empire, in 330, he discovered the statue at Susa and had it shipped back to Athens. When the statue, on its journey back, arrived at Rhodes it was given divine honors.

Several comments of the ancients regarding the statue have come down to us. When asked, in the presence of Dionysius, the tyrant of Syracuse, which type of bronze was the best, Antiphon the Sophist replied,  Lycurgus, in his oration against Leocrates, asserts that

 
Other sculptors made statues of the heroes, such as Praxiteles, who made two, also of bronze.

The statue group has been seen, in modern times, as an invitation to identify erotically and politically with the figures, and to become oneself a tyrannicide. According to Andrew Stewart, the statue

The configuration of the group is duplicated on a painted vase, a Panathenaic amphora from 400, and on a bas-relief on the Elgin throne, dated to ca. 300.

Skolia
Another tribute to the two heroes was a hymn (skolion) praising them for restoring isonomia (equal distribution of justice) to the Athenians. The skolion may be referred to 500 BC or thereabouts, and is ascribed to Callistratus, an Athenian poet known only for this work. It is preserved by Athenaeus. Its popularity was such that  
When sung, the singer would hold a branch of myrtle in his hand. This ode has been translated by many modern poets such as Edgar Allan Poe, who composed his Hymn to Aristogeiton and Harmodius in 1827. The following translation was judged to be the best and most faithful of a number of versions attempted in Victorian England.

In myrtles veil'd will I the falchion wear,
For thus the patriot sword
Harmodius and Aristogiton bare,
When they the tyrant's bosom gored, 
And bade the men of Athens be 
Regenerate in equality.

Oh! beloved Harmodius! never 
Shall death be thine, who liv'st for ever. 
Thy shade, as men have told, inherits 
The islands of the blessed spirits,
Where deathless live the glorious dead,
Achilles fleet of foot, and Diomed.

In myrtles veil'd will I the falchion wear, 
For thus the patriot sword
Harmodius and Aristogiton bare,
When they the tyrant's bosom gored; 
When in Minerva's festal rite 
They closed Hipparchus' eyes in night.

Harmodius' praise, Aristogiton's name, 
Shall bloom on earth with undecaying fame; 
Who with the myrtle-wreathed sword 
The tyrant's bosom gored, 
And bade the men of Athens be 
Regenerate in equality.

Importance to the erastes-eromenos tradition
The story of Harmodius and Aristogeiton, and its treatment by later Greek writers, is illustrative of attitudes to pederasty in ancient Greece. Both Thucydides and Herodotus describe the two as lovers, their love affair was styled as moderate (sophron) and legitimate (dikaios). Further confirming the status of the two as paragons of pederastic ethics, a domain forbidden to slaves, a law was passed prohibiting slaves from being named after the two heroes.

The story continued to be cited as an admirable example of heroism and devotion for many years. In 346 BC, for example, the politician Timarchus was prosecuted (for political reasons) on the grounds that he had prostituted himself as a youth. The orator who defended him, Demosthenes, cited Harmodius and Aristogeiton, as well as Achilles and Patroclus, as examples of the beneficial effects of same-sex relationships. Aeschines offers them as an example of dikaios erōs, "just love", and as proof of the boons such love brings to lovers – who were both improved by love beyond all praise – as well as to the city.

See also
Athenian democracy
Harmodius and Aristogeiton (sculpture)

Notes
 Lucian refers to this "χαλκοῦς" (of copper) statue in Περὶ Παρασίτου,

References

Bibliography 
 Ancient sources
 
 
 

 

 

 

 

 Modern sources

 

 
 Fabbro, Helena (1995). Carmina Convivalia Attica. Critical Edition with Translation and Commentary. Roma (publisher Istituti Editoriali e Poligrafici Internazionali) pp. 30–34, 76–77, 137–152

External links 
Livius, Harmodius and Aristogeiton by Jona Lendering

514 BC deaths
6th-century BC Athenians
Ancient LGBT people
Ancient rebels
Archaic Athens
Articles about multiple people in ancient Greece
Assassins of heads of government
Duos
Greek assassins
Greek rebels
Greek torture victims
Greek gay men
Same-sex couples
Year of birth unknown